Alice Åström (born 1959) is a Swedish Left Party politician. She was a member of the Riksdag from 1994 to 2010.

References

External links
Alice Åström at the Riksdag website 

1959 births
20th-century Swedish women politicians
20th-century Swedish politicians
21st-century Swedish women politicians
Living people
Members of the Riksdag 1994–1998
Members of the Riksdag 1998–2002
Members of the Riksdag 2002–2006
Members of the Riksdag 2006–2010
Members of the Riksdag from the Left Party (Sweden)
Women members of the Riksdag